"Filmstar" is the fifth and final single from the album Coming Up by Suede, released on 11 August 1997 on Nude Records. The single hit the top 10, peaking at number nine, thus making all five singles released from the album top ten hits. The live songs on CD2 are performed with Neil Tennant. "Filmstar" was produced by Ed Buller, while "Graffiti Women" and "Duchess" were produced by Ian Caple.

The music video for the "Filmstar", in black and white, was directed by Zowie Broach, and features the band in a typical live concert setting. The audience in this case were special invitees through the band's official fanclub, who were prominently featured in the video. Fans who attended the shoot were treated to a short but free Suede concert as a reward for having to watch the band run through "Filmstar" multiple times, as is standard on video shoots.

Track listings

7" vinyl single
 "Filmstar" (Brett Anderson, Richard Oakes)
 "Filmstar (original demo)" (Anderson, Oakes)

CD1 single
 "Filmstar" (Anderson, Oakes)
 "Graffiti Women" (Anderson)
 "Duchess" (Anderson, Neil Codling)

CD2 single
 "Filmstar" (Anderson, Oakes)
 "Rent (live)" (Neil Tennant, Chris Lowe)
 "Saturday Night (live)" (Anderson, Oakes)

References

1996 songs
1997 singles
Suede (band) songs
Songs written by Brett Anderson
Songs written by Richard Oakes (guitarist)
Song recordings produced by Ed Buller